Kalkatak is a town in the Khyber Pakhtunkhwa province of Pakistan.A hamlet on the left bank of the Chitral river below Drosh, situated on a steep, protruding cliff.  Languages: Kalasha,Dardic, Phalura, Gawarbati etc. The inhabitants are Muslims.

Kalkatak is an ex Kalasha village in( Urdu) Kalkatak Southren Chitral in northern Pakistan. The village is home to three languages Kalasha, Palula and Khowar. Accorting to the census 2017 report, the population of the village is near to 3000. The village is also has been hosting a great number of .Afghan refuges since 1980

See also 
Arandu, Khyber Pakhtunkhwa

References

External links
Khyber-Pakhtunkhwa Government website section on Lower Dir
United Nations

Populated places in Chitral District
Union councils of Chitral District